Jadoogadu is a 2015 Indian Telugu film directed by Yogie and produced by V.V.N Prasad under the banner Sathyaa Entertainments. It features Naga Shourya and Sonarika Bhadoria in the lead roles while Ashish Vidyarthi and Ajay appear in crucial roles. This movie marks the debut of Sonarika Bhadoria in Tollywood. Sonarika Bhadoria and Zakir Hussain was introduce by Roshan Pathak Casting Director The film was released worldwide on 26 June 2015.

Cast 
 Naga Shourya as Krishna
 Sonarika Bhadoria as Parvathi
 Ashish Vidyarthi
 Ajay as Guntur Seenu
 Zakir Hussain as Srisailam 
 Ravi Kale as Selva
 Saptagiri as Puli
 Srinivasa Reddy
 Prudhviraj
 Kota Srinivasa Rao

Soundtrack 

The audio launch of the film was held on 21 April 2015 and it witnessed yesteryear celebs at the venue. The soundtrack of the film was composed by Sagar Mahathi, son of Mani Sharma, who gave blockbuster musical hits in his time.
The soundtrack of this movie is produced under the banner of Mango Music.

Track listing

Release
It released on 26 June 2015.

References

External links
 

2015 films
Films shot in Telangana
2010s Telugu-language films
Indian action films
2015 action films